Rasmus Peter Faber (born May 16, 1979) is a Swedish pianist, DJ, remixer, composer, record producer, sound engineer, and founder of the record label Farplane Records. He is notable in the electronic dance music genre, and performs solo as a DJ and pianist, and live with his band the RaFa Orchestra. Over the last decade Rasmus has become better known as a composer of music for anime, computer games, advertising and virtual reality worlds.



History

Early life and musician career 
Rasmus Faber was born in Stockholm, Sweden. His father was jazz saxophonist Gunnar Bergsten, and mother free-lance journalist Mia Faber. Rasmus started playing piano on his own at age 7, and started taking jazz piano lessons soon thereafter. His schooling also included choir singing and music theory. In his late teens Rasmus attended one of Sweden's most renowned music colleges/high schools, Södra Latins gymnasium where he met a lot of the musicians he would continue to work with throughout his career and to this day. There he also attained many of the skills that would fuel his career as a jazz pianist, arranger, and composer.
At age 20, following his musical education, Rasmus Faber started working as a session musician, and as a pianist and musical director for local acts in Sweden. 
At age 25, Rasmus decided to quit this career to focus solely on his own artistry, while still performing as a pianist in his own musical projects and in his DJ sets.

Producer career 
Around age 21, Rasmus got involved in the Stockholm club scene as an organiser. Various encounters with DJs and artists lead to an interest in dance music, particularly the kind of house music that allowed for fusing of the genres he had been playing as a musician, such as jazz and Latin. He also took great interest in the evolution of 2-Step and UK Garage. After working in the studio as a session musician with different Swedish dance music producers, Rasmus decided to start producing himself. His first single Never Felt So Fly, together with singer Melo, was released in 2002 on UK record label Black Vinyl Records. After its success, his career and reputation grew quickly, and Rasmus started collaborating with big dance label Defected Records, and achieved further success and notoriety with his remix of Junior Jack's E Samba. He also started his own label Farplane Records in 2003. The first single on the label was the track Ever After, featuring singer Emily McEwan, which was a successful club hit worldwide.

This success, and subsequent requests to perform as a DJ, lead Rasmus into starting his career as a DJ. Later tracks released by him include Get Over Here (also available in a remix version by Axwell), Are You Ready, and Good Times Come Back. Together with Alf Tumble, in 2011, Rasmus released Wilder Side, which featured soul legend Candi Staton. Rasmus Faber has made remixes for, among many others: Kaskade, Axwell, Miguel Migs, Junior Jack, Dennis Ferrer, and Sandy Rivera.

Over the last decade, Rasmus has become something of a multi-instrumentalist and procurer of rare and sometimes exotic instruments (and performers) such as the nyckelharpa and tongue drum (used on YouTube virtual celebrity project Artiswitch) which has allowed for daring and boundary-pushing scoring and soundtrack production. Artistic progression with Rasmus’s own artist releases is also a keystone to his longevity and continued popularity exemplified by the fact his most recent artist album Two Left Feel (2019) was recorded and performed entirely with live instruments and analogue techniques by Rasmus himself. In addition, his recent very ‘non-house’ down-tempo single Be Real has become his most popular release to date with more than 24 million streams on Spotify and counting.

Career in Japan and anime 
In 2006, after starting a collaboration with Japanese record label Victor Entertainment (JVC Music), Rasmus Faber released a CD called So Far, compiling many of his more prolific works to date. The album was a big success, and kick started regular DJ performances around the country several times every year.

Expanding his collaboration with Victor Entertainment, Rasmus continued to release two compilation album follow ups with his own material, called "2 Far" and "So Far 3", two DJ mix albums; "Love:Mixed" and "Love:Mixed 2", and his own artist album with its remix version "Where We Belong" and "Where We Belong - RaFa's Epic Journey".

He has also compiled several compilation albums, as well as the series "Rasmus Faber Presents", introducing new artists to the Japanese market such as; Simon Grey, Opolopo, and Richard Earnshaw.

A mutual interest in Japanese anime with Victor Entertainment A&R Hirofumi Iwanaga, then lead to projects outside the dance music scene. Together with music journalist Yuzuru Sato, the jazz album series "Platina Jazz" was conceived. It is a series of Japanese anime songs, played in jazz versions, performed by Swedish musicians. Produced, arranged, and mixed by Rasmus, the album series has now reached its 6th volume, including two live DVDs.

His involvement in the anime music scene, and the Japanese pop scene, eventually lead to Rasmus producing and writing songs for artists such as Yoko Kanno, Maaya Sakamoto, Megumi Nakajima, Akino Arai, and Ayuse Kozue. Rasmus also wrote the theme song "Try Unite" for the anime series Lagrange: The Flower of Rin-ne, sung by Megumi Nakajima, first famous for her role as Ranka Lee in the anime series Macross Frontier. In 2015, Rasmus worked with Maaya Sakamoto to produce  for the anime series Gourmet Girl Graffiti, and "Waiting for the Rain" for The Asterisk War. He went on to work with Haruka Chisuga in 2016 to produce "Ai no Uta (Words of Love)", ending theme to the second season of The Asterisk War. Faber also went on to produce the original soundtrack of Harukana Receive, which was released on September 26, 2018. Rasmus composed the entire score to The Asterisk War#Anime series 2 in 2017, the theme song to the anime version of Moriarty the Patriot in 2021, the score to Amaim Warrior at the Borderline aka Kyouki Senki for Bandai Spirits in 2021 and the score to the YouTube anime series 'Artiswitch' for Bandai Namco Filmworks also in 2021.

IMDB Composer / Music Credits.

 Music department | Composer
Music department (8 credits)
 2021Moriarty the Patriot (TV Series) (theme music composer - 13 episodes)
- The Final Problem, Act 2 (2021) ... (theme music composer)
- The Final Problem, Act 1 (2021) ... (theme music composer)
- The Two Criminals (2021) ... (theme music composer)
- The Sign of Mary (2021) ... (theme music composer)
- The White Knight of London, Act 2 (2021) ... (theme music composer)
Show all 13 episodes
 2020D4DJ Groovy Mix (Video Game) (composer additional music)
 2019Ensemble Stars (TV Series) (composer additional music - 2 episodes)
- Miracle (2019) ... (composer additional music)
- Retrospective Special (2019) ... (composer additional music)
 2018Takunomi (TV Mini Series) (theme music composer - 12 episodes)
- Asahi Super Dry (2018) ... (theme music composer)
- Daishichi (2018) ... (theme music composer)
- Orion beer (2018) ... (theme music composer)
- Otoko Ume Sour (2018) ... (theme music composer)
- Kakubin (2018) ... (theme music composer)
Show all 12 episodes
 2017Arcaea (Video Game) (composer additional music)
 The Asterisk War (TV Series) (lyrics and music - 15 episodes, 2015 - 2016) (music - 12 episodes, 2015 - 2016) (vocals - 2 episodes, 2015 - 2016)
- Reunion (2016) ... (lyrics and music: Hold You in the Wind) / (vocals: Hold You in the Wind)
- The Lonely Strega (2016) ... (music: ending theme)
- Lieseltania (2016) ... (music: ending theme)
- Clinching Victory (2016) ... (music: ending theme)
- The Phoenix Showdown (2016) ... (music: ending theme)
Show all 24 episodes
 2015Koufuku Graffiti (TV Series) (theme music composer - 12 episodes)
- Shimishimi, Mugyu. (2015) ... (theme music composer)
- Jakijaki, Zururu./Shaku, Teritsuya~. (2015) ... (theme music composer)
- Hamohamo, Michichi. (2015) ... (theme music composer)
- Gutsugutsu, Heha... (2015) ... (theme music composer)
- Hokuhoku, Hapu. (2015) ... (theme music composer)
Show all 12 episodes
 2012Lagrange: The Flower of Rin-ne (TV Series) (theme music composer - 24 episodes)
- Another Day in Kamogawa (2012) ... (theme music composer)
- A White Kamogawa (2012) ... (theme music composer)
- Beyond the Seas of Kamogawa (2012) ... (theme music composer)
- Betrayal Over the Skies of Kamogawa (2012) ... (theme music composer)
- A Vow to Kamogawa (2012) ... (theme music composer)
Show all 24 episodes
Hide HideComposer (4 credits)
 2021AMAIM Warrior at the Borderline (TV Series) (13 episodes)
- Battle of the Oki Islands: Part 2 (2021)
- Battle of the Oki Islands: Part 1 (2021)
- Encirclement (2021)
- Expedition (2021)
- Autonomous Area (2021)
Show all 13 episodes
 2021ArtisWitch (TV Series)
 2018Harukana Receive (TV Series) (12 episodes)
- And That's Why We Choose Our Irreplaceable Partners (2018)
- At This Point, We're Basically Playing Head-to-Head (2018)
- The One I Wanted to Fight (2018)
- This Is How I Feel (2018)
- I'll Keep Our Promise (2018)
Show all 12 episodes
 2015-2016The Asterisk War (TV Series) (24 episodes)
- Reunion (2016)
- The Lonely Strega (2016)
- Lieseltania (2016)
- Clinching Victory (2016)
- The Phoenix Showdown (2016)
Show all 24 episodes

RaFa Orchestra 
Since 2009, Rasmus Faber has been playing his songs live, together with a group of 10 musicians and singers forming the RaFa Orchestra. The band members have all been playing on Rasmus' recordings for many years. Selected venues they have played include Billboard Live Tokyo/Osaka, Java Jazz Festival, Jakarta, Indonesia & the Southport Weekender Festival, UK.

References

External links 
 

1979 births
Swedish house musicians
Living people
Swedish DJs
Electronic dance music DJs